"Multi Millionaire" is a song by American rapper Lil Pump featuring fellow American rapper Lil Uzi Vert. It is the fourth single from Lil Pump's second studio album Harverd Dropout (2019). It was released as the album's fourth single on October 5, 2018. The release date of the song marks the day before the first anniversary of Pump's self-titled debut studio album. It was produced by Danny Wolf, Hanzo, and Dilip.

Background
The song samples Gucci Mane's "Multi Millionaire LaFlare" (2016). The single represents the second time Lil Pump has collaborated with Lil Uzi Vert, the first being on a Desto Dubb posse cut titled "Bankteller" that also features 03 Greedo and Smokepurpp. HotNewHipHop described the song as a "frantic synth instrumental, reflecting on the vast extent of their material wealth."

Composition
The song features "heavy drums" with an "electro-laser" melody and Pump's signature one-word repeat. Uzi Vert appears during their verse after the second hook. Consequence of Sound described the song as featuring "the two MCs boasting about lovers located all over the globe, pricey loads of drugs, and even more expensive rides."

Charts

References

2018 songs
Lil Pump songs
Lil Uzi Vert songs
Songs written by Lil Pump
Songs written by Lil Uzi Vert
Warner Music Group singles